Thomas Pickering (born 1906, date of death unknown) was an English professional footballer who played as a centre forward. Born in Egremont, Cumberland, he started his career playing local league football with his hometown club, before joining Football League Third Division North side Nelson as an amateur on 1 January 1927. He made his debut for the club on the same day, deputising for the injured regular centre forward Jimmy Hampson in the 3–0 win against Wrexham at Seedhill. Pickering was awarded a professional contract five days later, and remained at Nelson for a further two months but he did not make another senior appearance for the Lancashire club and returned to Egremont in March 1927. His stay was brief, however, as he transferred to nearby Parton Athletic in the summer of the same year.

References

1906 births
Year of death missing
People from Egremont, Cumbria
English footballers
Association football forwards
Nelson F.C. players
Egremont F.C. players
English Football League players
Footballers from Cumbria